Hugh Watt was Deputy Prime Minister of New Zealand from 1972 to 1974.

Hugh Watt may also refer to:

 Hugh Watt (Canadian politician) (c. 1841–1914), physician and political figure in British Columbia
 Hugh Watt (British politician)  (1848–1921), Scottish merchant and Member of the House of Commons
 Hugh Watt (moderator) (1879–1968), Scottish minister and historian

See also
 Hugh Watts (1922–1993), English cricketer
 Watt (disambiguation)
 Hugh (disambiguation)